The Caroline Rhea Show is a short-lived American syndicated variety/talk show hosted by actress and comedian Caroline Rhea. It premiered on September 2, 2002, and ran until May 21, 2003. The show was regarded as the successor to The Rosie O'Donnell Show; Rosie O'Donnell selected Rhea, who had hosted the last few weeks of Rosie, as her replacement.

Format
In many ways, The Caroline Rhea Show was similar to its predecessor The Rosie O'Donnell Show and the more successful The Ellen DeGeneres Show; all three programs were daytime talk shows that were run like nighttime talk shows, with monologues and house bands and celebrity (and sometimes non-celebrity) guests.

Unlike O'Donnell's daytime show, on which audience members opened the shows by announcing the day's guests, announcer Chip Zien would begin episodes of The Caroline Rhea Show by saying, "Live from New York, it's The Caroline Rhea Show! On today's show: [names of guests]...Here's Caroline!" The first five words, "Live from New York, it's," mimicked the opening tagline to Saturday Night Live, produced in the neighboring Studio 8-H. The show's intro song was Neil Diamond's "Sweet Caroline," and the audience would often sing along, vocalizing the three notes after the song's eponymous chorus and chanting "so good, so good" in response to "good times never seemed so good."

Production
Like its predecessor, The Caroline Rhea Show was taped in Studio 8-G at NBC's Rockefeller Center Studios in New York City. The show's house band was led by trumpeter Chris Botti. Former David Bowie guitarist and musical collaborator Carlos Alomar was the musical director.

Some stations that aired Rosie also aired Caroline Rhea, but some (like WABC-TV in New York, which gave the former Rosie spot to The Wayne Brady Show) aired the show in an undesirable late-night time slot.

Most television markets that had aired the show replaced it with The Ellen DeGeneres Show, which was offered by the syndicator of both Rhea's and O'Donnell's show, Warner Bros. Television's Telepictures division. New York station WLNY-TV, which was a secondary carrier of both series, added Ellen while WABC did not; it was instead given to WNBC.

References

External links
 

2000s American television talk shows
2002 American television series debuts
2003 American television series endings
English-language television shows
First-run syndicated television programs in the United States
Television series by Warner Bros. Television Studios
Television series by Telepictures